Alan Durning (born  November 7, 1964 as Alan Bresler Durning, then Alan Thein Durning from 1991 to 2008) is the founder and executive director of the Sightline Institute (formerly Northwest Environment Watch), a nonprofit organization based in Seattle, Washington, U.S.

Durning grew up in Seattle, spent his high school years in Chevy Chase, Maryland, and attended Oberlin College during the mid-1980s.  From 1986 to 1993, Durning worked as a researcher at the Worldwatch Institute in Washington, D.C.  In 1993, Durning returned to Seattle and founded Northwest Environment Watch.

Durning is the author or coauthor of dozens of books and articles.  His published books include, among others: 
 How Much Is Enough?: The Consumer Society and the Future of the Earth
 This Place on Earth: Home and the Practice of Permanence
 The Car and the City
 Misplaced Blame: The Real Roots of Population Growth 
 Stuff: The Secret Lives of Everyday Things
 Tax Shift
 Green Collar Jobs: Working in the New Northwest
Unlocking Home: Three Keys to Affordable Communities

Durning's newspaper and magazine articles have appeared in more than 100 periodicals, including The New York Times, Los Angeles Times, Washington Post, Foreign Policy, and Slate.  Durning has been a commentator on National Public Radio and has lectured at universities, conferences, and at the White House.

External links 
 http://www.sightline.org/about/staff/alanbio

1964 births
American environmentalists
Sustainability advocates
Living people
Oberlin College alumni
People from Seattle
People from Chevy Chase, Maryland
Activists from Maryland
Activists from Washington (state)